Wald im Pinzgau is a municipality in the district of Zell am See (Pinzgau region), in the state of Salzburg in Austria.

Municipal divisions
The villages in the municipality, apart from Wald, are (further up the valley) Hinterwaldberg, Königsleiten, Lahn, Vorderkrimml, and Vorderwaldberg, with a combined population of about 800.
The so-called Katastralgemeinden are Hinterwaldberg with 4,234.87 ha and Wald with 2,688.97 ha.

Population

References

External links

 
Cities and towns in Zell am See District
Kitzbühel Alps
Venediger Group